Florinnell Francis Morton (December 20, 1904 – January 4, 1990) was an American librarian, educator, and president of the American Library Association from 1961 to 1962.

She served as Director of the Library School at Louisiana State University from 1944 to 1971. Prior to joining LSU, Morton had been on staff of the Library at the University of North Texas.

She was married to Charles Hester Morton.

Publications
 "Ideals in the preparation of librarians: Standards for accreditation" (Kansas State Teachers College, 1961)
 "Career Guidance: A Key to Recruiting" ALA Bulletin, v52 n8 (September 1958), p. 578

References

 

1904 births
1990 deaths
American librarians
American women librarians
Presidents of the American Library Association
20th-century American women
20th-century American people